The second season of Reign, an American historical fantasy, consisted of 22 episodes which aired between October 2, 2014, and May 14, 2015.  The series, created by Stephanie SenGupta and Laurie McCarthy, aired on The CW.

Season overview

The season opens after the death of King Henry II, and follows the rise of Francis and Mary as King and Queen of France and Scotland. Together they have to balance their marriage with their roles as monarchs, and deal with the rising religious conflict between Catholics and Protestants, as well as the ambitions of the rival House of Bourbon for the throne of France.

Cast and characters

Main
 Adelaide Kane as Mary, Queen of Scots
 Toby Regbo as Francis II of France 
 Megan Follows as Catherine de' Medici
 Torrance Coombs as Sebastian "Bash" de Poitiers
 Celina Sinden as Lady Greer
 Caitlin Stasey as Lady Kenna 
 Anna Popplewell as Lady Lola 
 Jonathan Keltz as Leith Bayard
 Sean Teale as Prince Louis of Condé 
 Craig Parker as Stéphane Narcisse 
 Rose Williams as Princess Claude of France

Recurring
 Rossif Sutherland as Nostradamus
 Amy Brenneman as Marie de Guise 
 Michael Therriault as Aloysius Castleroy 
 Alexandra Ordolis as Delphine 
 Ben Aldridge as Antoine of Navarre 
 Vince Nappo as Renaude
 Jane Spidell as Caroline
 Linzee Barclay as Sharlene

Guest
 Alan van Sprang as Henry II of France 
 Rachel Skarsten as Queen Elizabeth I 
 Anna Walton as Lady Diane de Poitiers 
 Katie Boland as Clarissa de Medici 
 Gil Darnell as Christian, Duke of Guise
 Kjartan Hewitt as Eduard Narcisse
 Ella Ballentine as Voland girl
 Ari Millen as Roger
 Charlotte Hegele as Jenny
 Noam Jenkins as Lord Gifford
 Salvatore Antonio as Cardinal Vasari
 Siobhan Williams as Amelie
 Rob Stewart as Lord Burgess
 Jonathan Watton as Ridley
 Pascal Langdale as a Cardinal
 Vincent Gale as Lord Akers

Episodes

References

2014 American television seasons
2015 American television seasons